Partin is a surname. Notable people with the surname include:

Alan W. Partin (born 1961), American prostate surgeon and researcher
Darryl Partin (born 1987), American basketball player
Edward Grady Partin (1924–1990), American labor leader
Phillup Partin (born 1965), American convicted murderer

See also
Gartin
Martin (name)